Lee Eun-ku is a retired male badminton player from South Korea.

Career
He won the bronze medal at the 1983 IBF World Championships in men's doubles with Park Joo-bong.

Achievements

World Championships 
Men's doubles

Asian Games 
Men's doubles

References
European results
IBF World Championships

South Korean male badminton players
Asian Games medalists in badminton
Living people
Badminton players at the 1982 Asian Games
Asian Games bronze medalists for South Korea
Year of birth missing (living people)
Medalists at the 1982 Asian Games